Pisang  is a village development committee in Manang District in the Gandaki Zone of northern Nepal. At the time of the 2011 Nepal census it had a population of 307  people living in 105 individual households.  The village is located in the Marshyangdi River valley, directly south of Pisang Peak, north of Annapurna II, and west of Paungda Danda.

References

Populated places in Manang District, Nepal